The 2021–22 Andebol 1 (known as the Campeonato Placard Andebol 1) was the 70th season of the Andebol 1, Portuguese premier handball league. It ram from 18 September 2021 to 4 June 2022.

Porto won their twenty-third title.

Teams

Arenas and locations
The following 16 clubs compete in the Portuguese League during the 2021–22 season:

League table

Promotion/relegation play-offs
The 13th and 14th-placed teams of the Andebol 1 faces the 2nd-placed team of the Segunda Divisão. The first place promoted to Andebol 1 and the last two relegated to Santo Tirso.

Top goalscorers

See also
 2021–22 Taça de Portugal

References

External links
Portuguese Handball Federaration 

Andebol 1
Portugal
Handball
Handball